Franjo Ksaver Kuhač (November 20, 1834 – June 18, 1911) was a piano teacher, choral conductor, composer, and comparative musicologist who studied Croatian folk music.  Kuhač did a great deal of field work in this area, collecting and publishing 1,600 folk songs.  Like Cecil Sharp, who did similar work in Britain and Appalachia, Kuhač published the folk songs with a piano accompaniment.

Biography
Kuhač was born in Osijek on 20 November 1834 in a German family as Franz Xaver Koch. In Osijek he finished elementary school and Gymnasium. From 1848 to 1851 he was training to become a teacher in Donji Miholjac. After becoming a teacher, Kuhač went to study music in Pest, Hungary. Later, he went to Vienna, Leipzig and Weimar where Franz Liszt taught him piano playing. While analyzing different kinds of traditional music and discussing with his teachers about the relationship of folk music  and classical music, he found out the value of folk music. From 1858 to 1871 he taught piano playing and singing in Osijek. He also was the chairman of the Osijek singing society where he conducted works of Slavic composers. In that period, he traveled across  Europe, from Bulgaria to Germany and from Slovenia to Macedonia. He probably collected over 5000 folk songs in that period. In 1871 he changed his name to Franjo Ksaver Kuhač. In 1871 he moved to Zagreb where he taught piano at the Croatian Musical Institute (HGZ). From 1878 to 1881 he published his magnum opus, Južnoslavenske narodne popjevke (Southslavic folk songs). Most of the Croatian musicological etymology was introduced by Kuhač when he translated Johann Christian Lobe's Katechismus der Musik. He published the following books:

 Južnoslavenske narodne popjevke (South-Slavic Folk Songs), Zagreb, 1871
 Uputa u glasoviranje (Instruction in Piano-Playing), two volumes, 1896 and 1897
 Valpovo i njegovi gospodari (Valpovo And Its Proprietors), Zagreb, 1876
 Ilirski glazbenici (Illyrian Musicians), Zagreb, 1893

Kuhač became well known for tracing similarities between the Croatian folk tunes he collected and various themes in the music of Joseph Haydn.  He also was known for his conjecture that Haydn was not Austrian but Croatian, a member of the Croatian ethnic minority resident in the Burgenland region of Austria.  For more on both of these aspects of Kuhač's research, see Haydn and folk music.  He died in Zagreb.

Sources
Kuhač, Franjo Ksaver

External links
 www.kuhac.net (The web site promotes Kuhac through a biography, a digital archive of his works with sound recordings, a photo gallery, extensive bibliography of Kuhac's works and works written about Kuhac)
 https://hgz.academia.edu/FranjoKsaverKuhac Repository of writings by Franjo Ksaver Kuhač

1834 births
1911 deaths
Croatian composers
Croatian musicians
Haydn scholars
Croatian musicologists
Burials at Mirogoj Cemetery
People from Osijek
Choral composers